Echoism may refer to:

 The formation of words by imitating sounds, a form of onomatopoeia ( Related to English ) 
 Echoism (facial symmetry), a theorised aspect of facial symmetry
 Echoism (psychology), the opposite of narcissism